Antonio Lauro (died 1609) was a Roman Catholic prelate who served as Bishop of Belcastro (1599–1609).

On 13 September 1599, Antonio Lauro was appointed by Pope Clement VIII as Bishop of Belcastro. He served as Bishop of Belcastro until his death in 1609.

References

External links and additional sources
 (for Chronology of Bishops) 
 (for Chronology of Bishops) 

16th-century Italian Roman Catholic bishops
17th-century Italian Roman Catholic bishops
Bishops appointed by Pope Clement VIII
1609 deaths